Arthur Oliver Villiers Russell, 2nd Baron Ampthill  (19 February 1869 – 7 July 1935) was a British peer, rower, and civil servant. He served as Governor of Madras from October 1900 to February 1906, and as acting Viceroy of India from April to December 1904.

Russell also served as the Viceroy of India from April 1904 to December 1904, when Lord Curzon periodically returned to England.

Early life

Arthur Oliver Villiers Russell was born on 19 February 1869 in Rome. He was the eldest son of the 1st Baron Ampthill, and Lady Emily Theresa (née Villiers), who was Lady of the Bedchamber to Queen Victoria and daughter of the 4th Earl of Clarendon. Russell succeeded to the barony of Ampthill at the age of 15 on the death of his father. He was educated at Chignell's, Eton College, and New College, Oxford, from which he graduated in 1892 with a third-class honours in modern history. His entry in Vanity Fair noted of him: 
{{quotation|He is a very tall, very agreeable, and good-looking young man, with a long, strong back, which is worth much in a boat. He is a Freemason and a Liberal Unionist, though he has not yet become famous in the House of Lords. He intends to devote himself to the management of Foreign Affairs. He can shoot. He has many friends who call him "Dick."}}

Politics

In 1895, Russell was appointed Assistant Secretary to the Colonial Secretary, Joseph Chamberlain: in 1897, he was promoted to Private Secretary, but did not continue in this position as a consequence of his sympathy with the natives of South- and East- Africa, and of India. During the First World War, Lord Ampthill commanded a battalion of the Leicestershire Regiment, and two battalions of the Bedfordshire Regiment in France.

Governor of Madras

Russell was appointed Governor of the Madras Presidency on 5September 1900, when he was aged 31 years. He served in this position from 1900 to 1906: his tenure was almost contemporaneous with Lord Curzon's Viceregality. As Governor of Madras, Ampthill he inaugurated the King Institute in Madras; the Rangaraya Medical College in Cocanada, on 4 December 1903; and the Cochin State Forest Tramway, the latter on 3October 1905. During Russell's tenure, sympathy for the Oriya Movement for the creation of a separate province of Orissa increased: Russell opposed the demands for the separation of the Oriya-speaking tracts of Vizagapatam and Ganjam districts from Madras.

Viceroy of India

When Lord Curzon's tenure came to an end in 1904, Russell was chosen to act as the Viceroy of India until the appointment of a new Viceroy. Russell served from April to December 1904 as Viceroy of India. During his tenure, the proponents of a separate province of Orissa submitted a petition to this effect to Russell. However, Russell rejected all demands to create a separate province of Orissa and include areas from Madras Presidency in it.

As Viceroy, Russell was loyal to Curzon and successfully countered the efforts of St John Brodrick, 1st Earl of Midleton, the Secretary of State for India, who wanted to introduce anti-Curzon policies. However, he was unsuccessful against Lord Kitchener, who tightened his stranglehold over the military department.

Later life

On returning to England in 1906, Russell took up the cause of Indians in South Africa. He chaired an advisory committee on Indian students in the United Kingdom but disagreed with the Secretary of State for India John Morley on the issue of constitutional reforms. In 1909, Russell wrote an introduction to Joseph Doke's book M. K. Gandhi: an Indian Patriot in South Africa.

On 13July 1909, Lord Ampthill was appointed a Deputy Lieutenant of Bedfordshire. He then went on to fight in the First World War, during which he was twice mentioned in despatches, and was one of the co-founders of the National Party in 1917. He retired from the service in 1926 with the rank of colonel. Lord Ampthill was President of The Magic Circle.

Death
Lord Ampthill died of pneumonia 7July 1935, a day before Nickalls, prompting the following anonymous epigram among the various tributes in The Times:
Oarsmen they lived, and silver goblets mark
The well-timed prowess of their trusty blades:
In death their rhythm kept, they now embark
To row their long last course among the Shades

Family
On 6 October 1894, Ampthill married Lady Margaret Lygon, the daughter of the 6th Earl Beauchamp in Madresfield, Worcestershire, and they had five children:
 John Russell, 3rd Baron Ampthill (1896–1973)
 Adm Sir Guy Russell (1898–1977)
 Phyllis Margaret Russell, OBE (3 June 1900 – c. 24 May 1998)
 Wg Cdr Edward Wriothesley Curzon Russell, OBE (2 June 1901 – 1982).
 Brig Leopold Oliver Russell, CBE, TD (26 January 1907 – 1988)

He was succeeded in the barony by his eldest son, John Russell.

Rowing

Lord Ampthill started rowing at Eton. His record of rowing was one of the longest of his time at Eton and he first had an oar in the Dreadnought on 1 March 1885, going on to be Captain of the Boats in 1887 and 1888.

Whilst at New College, Oxford Ampthill rowed for Oxford three times against Cambridge in the Boat Race (1889 to 1891), winning twice. He was president of both OUBC and the Oxford Union in 1891. After Oxford, he rowed for Leander Club for a short while then moved to London Rowing Club, becoming club president in 1893, a position he remained in for almost 40 years until his death in 1935.

Ampthill raced in the Ladies' Challenge Plate at Henley Royal Regatta for Eton in 1886, 1887 and 1888. In 1889 he raced both the Grand Challenge Cup and the Silver Goblets, losing in the final of the latter by 2-foot to CUBC in a race which the Henley records for the year describe as "One of the best and closest races ever seen" . In 1890 he again competed in both events, this time racing under New College colours, and collected his first Henley medal, rowing with Guy Nickalls in the Goblets.

In 1891, racing this time as Leander, Lord Ampthill was in the crew which won the Grand Challenge Cup, setting a new course record. He also repeated his Goblets win, again with Guy Nickalls. Lord Ampthill was elected a Steward of Henley Royal Regatta in 1896, a role he performed until 1900 then again from 1910 until 1927. 

Henley wins
1890 – Silver Goblets (rowing as Oxford University Boat Club, with Guy Nickalls)
1891 – Grand Challenge Cup (rowing as Leander Club)
1891 – Silver Goblets (rowing as Leander Club, with Guy Nickalls)

 International Olympic Committee 
Between 1894 and 1898, Lord Ampthill was a member of the original International Olympic Committee.

Freemasonry
Ampthill was initiated into Apollo University Lodge No. 357, Oxford, in 1890. He went on to take the chair in several lodges, including Bard of Avon Lodge No. 778, Hampton Court; Royal Alpha Lodge No. 16, London; and Grand Master's Lodge No. 1, London. He was appointed Provincial Grand Master of Bedfordshire in 1900 and as District Grand Master of Madras from 1901 to 1906. He served as Pro Grand Master of United Grand Lodge of England from 1908 until his death in 1935.

Lodge Ampthill No.3682 was consecrated in his name in 1914, and continues to meet in Coimbatore, India, under the District Grand Lodge of Madras of United Grand Lodge of England. Its celebrated its Centenary year in 2014.

Honours
After his appointment as Governor of Madras, Russell was appointed a Knight Grand Commander of the Order of the Indian Empire (GCIE) on 28 December 1900, shortly before his departure for India. He was later appointed a Knight Grand Commander of the Star of India (GCSI) on 2 September 1904.

See also
List of Oxford University Boat Race crews

References

Bibliography
  
  
  
  
  
  
  
  
 
 The London Gazette The New York Times'', 2 December 1906, p. 1

External links

Alumni of New College, Oxford
English male rowers
British male rowers
2
Bedfordshire and Hertfordshire Regiment officers
Royal Leicestershire Regiment officers
British Army personnel of World War I
Deputy Lieutenants of Bedfordshire
Governors of Madras
Knights Grand Commander of the Order of the Star of India
Knights Grand Commander of the Order of the Indian Empire
1869 births
1935 deaths
Russell, Oliver
O
International Olympic Committee members
Ampthill
Members of Leander Club
Oxford University Boat Club rowers
Freemasons of the United Grand Lodge of England
Presidents of the Oxford Union
Eldest sons of British hereditary barons